The 2000–01 Calgary Flames season was the 21st National Hockey League season in Calgary.  It was a season for change, as the Flames let longtime general manager Al Coates go shortly before the draft and replaced him with highly touted Craig Button, previously with the Dallas Stars. The team also let head coach Brian Sutter go and replaced him with rookie coach Don Hay.  Hay would only last 68 games before being fired and replaced by Greg Gilbert.

The off-season also featured a "Save the Flames" ticket drive campaign, as owners warned that the team could be sold in the face of declining attendance and the pressures of doing business in American dollars while earning revenues in Canadian dollars.  The threats brought fears of the Flames moving south, as the Quebec Nordiques and Winnipeg Jets had done in previous seasons.  The goal was to increase the Flames' season-ticket base from its 1999–2000 low of 8,700 to 14,000.  The drive was ultimately successful, with the team reaching its ticket goal and acquiring a new title sponsor for their home arena, the Saddledome, as Pengrowth Management took over the naming rights from the defunct Canadian Airlines.

On the ice, the Flames continued to struggle, failing to win more than three consecutive games at any point.  While their top three forwards, Jarome Iginla, Valeri Bure, and Marc Savard, scored 91 goals between them, only two other players even reached double-digit goals on the season.  Calgary finished with a 27–36–15–4 record, fourth in the division and ahead of only the expansion Minnesota Wild. The Flames missed the playoffs for the fifth straight season.

The 2000–01 season was also notable in retrospect, as the Flames lost two players who would later go on to stardom for virtually nothing.  Ineffective forward Martin St. Louis was released as a free agent, while goaltender Jean-Sebastien Giguere was dealt to the Mighty Ducks of Anaheim for a 2nd round draft pick when the Flames found themselves with too many goaltenders heading into the 2000 NHL Expansion Draft.

In the expansion draft, which was held in Calgary, the Flames lost defenceman Filip Kuba to the Minnesota Wild, 15th overall, and Sergei Krivokrasov, also to the Wild, 32nd overall. The Columbus Blue Jackets did not select a player off of Calgary's roster.

Regular season

The Flames had the most power-play opportunities of all 30 teams, with 435.

Season standings

Schedule and results

Player statistics

Skaters
Note: GP = Games played; G = Goals; A = Assists; Pts = Points; PIM = Penalty minutes

†Denotes player spent time with another team before joining Calgary.  Stats reflect time with the Flames only.

Goaltenders
Note: GP = Games played; Min = Minutes played; W = Wins; L = Losses; OT = Overtime/shootout losses; GA = Goals against; SO = Shutouts; GAA = Goals against average

Transactions
The Flames were involved in the following transactions during the 2000–01 season.

Trades

Free agents

Draft picks

Calgary's picks at the 2000 NHL Entry Draft, held in Calgary. The Flames played to the home crowd, selecting Brent Krahn of the Calgary Hitmen with their first pick, 9th overall.

Farm teams

Saint John Flames
The 2000–01 AHL season was the eighth season for the Saint John Flames, all affiliated with the Flames. It was a record-setting year, as the Baby Flames ran away with the Canadian Division, finishing third overall in the league with a 44–24–7–5 record, good for 100 points.  Saint John swept through the Portland Pirates, Quebec Citadelles and Providence Bruins by a combined 12–2 record.  The Flames captured their only Calder Cup by defeating the Wilkes-Barre/Scranton Penguins 4 games to 2. Steve Begin won the Jack A. Butterfield Trophy as playoff MVP.

See also
2000–01 NHL season

References

Player stats: 2006–07 Calgary Flames Media Guide, pg 111
Game log: 2006–07 Calgary Flames Media Guide, pg 135
Team standings: NHL standings on espn.com

Calgary Flames seasons
Calgary Flames season, 2000-01
Cal